Dragon Tower, also known as Long Ta or Heilongjiang Tower, is a  tall multi-purpose Chinese steel lattice television and observation tower. The Long Ta is used for television broadcasting; telecommunication, transmitting FM-/TV-broadcasting throughout the province of Heilongjiang; for observation, providing a view of the surrounding areas of city. The tower has observation decks and buffet restaurants. It has a AAAA rating.

See also
Lattice tower
List of tallest towers in the world
List of tallest freestanding structures in the world
List of tallest freestanding steel structures
Long Bei Jing, Dragon Scenery, the television station group that is in this tower
Long Guang, Dragon Broadcast, the radio station group that is in this tower
Harbin
Heilongjiang

References

External links
Chinese: Official Website
Dragon Tower, Harbin - SkyscraperPage.com
Dragon Tower Harbin, Harbin Long Ta Tower with Plentiful Pictures :: Tour-Beijing.com
Official website from HLJTV

Buildings and structures in Harbin
Towers in China
Tourist attractions in Harbin
AAAA-rated tourist attractions
Towers completed in 2000
Observation towers in China
Communication towers in China
Towers with revolving restaurants
Lattice towers
2000 establishments in China